Peter Engel Trapa is an American mathematician and the dean of the College of Science at the University of Utah. His research focus is on the representation theory of reductive Lie groups. Trapa received his bachelor of arts in mathematics and integrated science from Northwestern University and his Ph.D. in mathematics from the Massachusetts Institute of Technology. While at MIT, Trapa studied representation theory with David Vogan. He completed postdoctoral work at the Institute for Advanced Study in Princeton, NJ, and Harvard University.

Career and Research 
Trapa currently serves as the dean of the College of Science at the University of Utah. He previously served as the chair of the Department of Mathematics and the chair of the Department of Physics & Astronomy.

Trapa works on unitary representations of Lie groups, and is a member of the Atlas of Lie Groups project. With Jeffrey Adams, Marc van Leuuwen, and David Vogan, he devised an algorithm to compute the unitary dual of a real reductive group. He was named a Fellow of the American Mathematical Society in 2019.

References 

Living people
American university and college faculty deans
Massachusetts Institute of Technology School of Science alumni
Northwestern University alumni
20th-century American mathematicians
21st-century American mathematicians
Fellows of the American Mathematical Society
1974 births